Karacalar (literally "roe deer" in Turkish) may refer to the following places in Turkey:

 Karacalar, Akyurt, a neighborhood of the district of Akyurt, Ankara Province
 Karaçalar, Araç, a neighborhood in the district of Araç, Kastamonu Province
 Karacalar, Çanakkale
 Karacalar, Emirdağ, a village in the district of Emirdağ, Afyonkarahisar Province
 Karacalar, Gölpazarı, a village in the district of Gölpazarı, Bilecik Province
 Karacalar, Göynük, a village in the district of Göynük, Bolu Province
 Karacalar, Manavgat, a village in the district of Manavgat, Antalya Province
 Karacalar, Mengen, a village in the district of Mengen, Bolu Province
 Karacalar, Savaştepe, a village
 Karacalar, Silvan
 Karacalar, Sındırgı, a village
 Karacalar, Üzümlü
 Karacalar Dam, a dam in Turkey

See also
 Karaca (disambiguation)
 Qarajalar (disambiguation)